WSKC-CD, UHF digital channel 14, is a low-powered KBS World-affiliated television station licensed to Atlanta, Georgia, United States. The station is owned by KM LPTV of Atlanta, LLC.

History

Early Years
The original callsign from 1984 was W04BR on channel 4.  It was briefly assigned W59CZ in 1995 or 1996 while changing channels to 59.  It became WSKC-LP after that and still identified itself as such, though its suffix was changed with the upgrade to class A in 2005, making it WSKC-CA.  It carried Korean programming from South Korea.

The analog station on channel 22, was located atop Sweat Mountain, and had a somewhat directional antenna, originally aimed generally southeast toward Atlanta.  It was issued a construction permit to change from channel 59 at the same power, and to rotate the existing antenna about 45° counterclockwise toward the east.  The original digital TV allotment for WGTV TV 8 was changed from 22 to 12 (and then to 8 in the digital channel election).

The station was granted a construction permit to flash-cut to digital on channel 22 at 800 watts, and an application filed in early August 2008 to increase this to 10 kilowatts.  A later application also specified that the very directional antenna point to the southeast again (instead of east), where it would cover its actual city of license of Atlanta, as well as Sandy Springs.

Since 2008
Per an application made in 2008, the permit was extended and modified again in 2010, to transmit from a point on the Norcross side of Duluth, just south of the interchange of Buford Highway (Georgia 13 and U.S. 23) and Pleasant Hill Road.  The station reaches all of Gwinnett and much of each surrounding county.

During March 2009, WSKC-CA was off-air.  In April 2009 it returned, again simulcasting WATC-DT 57.1.

In late July 2010, the station was reported as being on-air but now with its new digital signal, carrying digital subchannels 22.1 and 22.2, both identified as MBC.

Once the station was granted its broadcast license in early October 2010 to cover its digital changes, it became WSKC-CD, indicating a class A digital station.  It applied for this license in August 2010, but the following week applied to modify the construction permit to increase power from 10 kW to 15 kW, and to rotate the slightly directional antenna (which has circular radiation pattern but offset from the center) so that the maximum power output is southwest toward metro Atlanta, instead of east.

Digital television

Digital channel

References

Television channels and stations established in 1984
Low-power television stations in the United States
SKC-CD